Venus Williams was the defending champion but lost to her sister, Serena Williams in the semifinals. 

Serena won the title by beating first seeded Jennifer Capriati, 7–5, 7–6(7–4) in the final. Serena also became the second player in the Open Era after Steffi Graf to defeat the top-three ranked players at the same event; defeating world No. 3 Martina Hingis in the quarterfinals, No. 2 Venus in the semifinals and No. 1 Capriati in the final. Serena did not lose a set during the tournament.

Seeds
All seeds received a bye into the second round.

  Jennifer Capriati (finals)
  Venus Williams (semifinals)
  Martina Hingis (quarterfinals)
  Kim Clijsters (quarterfinals)
  Monica Seles (semifinals)
  Justine Henin (second round)
  Jelena Dokić (third round)
  Serena Williams (champion)
  Silvia Farina Elia (fourth round)
  Meghann Shaughnessy (third round)
  Arantxa Sánchez Vicario (fourth round)
  Elena Dementieva (quarterfinals)
  Daniela Hantuchová (second round)
  Amanda Coetzer (fourth round)
  Iroda Tulyaganova (fourth round)
  Magdalena Maleeva (third round)
  Lisa Raymond (third round)
  Tamarine Tanasugarn (third round)
  Barbara Schett (third round)
  Dája Bedáňová (second round)
  Ángeles Montolio (second round)
  Francesca Schiavone (second round)
  Alexandra Stevenson (fourth round)
  Ai Sugiyama (third round)
  Rita Grande (second round)
  Anne Kremer (fourth round)
  Henrieta Nagyová (second round)
  Tatiana Panova (quarterfinals)
  Cristina Torrens Valero (second round)
  Patty Schnyder (second round)
  Nathalie Dechy (second round)
  Anastasia Myskina (third round)

Draw

Finals

Top half

Section 1

Section 2

Section 3

Section 4

Bottom half

Section 5

Section 6

Section 7

Section 8

Qualifying

Qualifying seeds

Qualifiers

Lucky losers

Qualifying draw

First qualifier

Second qualifier

Third qualifier

Fourth qualifier

Fifth qualifier

Sixth qualifier

Seventh qualifier

Eighth qualifier

Ninth qualifier

Tenth qualifier

Eleventh qualifier

Twelfth qualifier

References

External links
 Official results archive (ITF)
 Official results archive (WTA)
 

2002 NASDAQ-100 Open
NASDAQ-100 Open - Women's Singles